A multimodal browser is one which allows multimodal interaction for input and/or output - for example, keyboard and voice interfaces. Examples include Opera and NetFront.

References 

Web browsers
Multimodal interaction